Marinko Šarkezi (born 3 May 1972) is a retired Slovenian football defender. In the Slovenian PrvaLiga, he spent seven seasons with Maribor and five seasons with Beltinci.

Honours
Maribor
Slovenian Championship: 1997–98, 1998–99, 1999–2000, 2000–01, 2001–02, 2002–03
Slovenian Cup: 1998–99, 2003–04

References

External links
PrvaLiga profile 
NK Maribor profile 

1972 births
Living people
Slovenian footballers
Association football defenders
NK Mura players
NK Beltinci players
NK Maribor players
Slovenian PrvaLiga players
Slovenian football managers
Slovenian expatriate footballers
Expatriate footballers in Austria
Slovenian expatriate sportspeople in Austria
Romani in Slovenia